Mario Montesanto (11 August 1909 – 29 March 1987) was an Italian association football manager and footballer who played as a midfielder. He represented the Italy national football team two times, the first being on 17 February 1935, the occasion of a friendly match against France in a 2–1 home win.

Honours

Player
Bologna
Serie A: 1935–36, 1936–37, 1938–39, 1940–41

References

External links
 
 

1909 births
1987 deaths
Italian footballers
Italy international footballers
Association football midfielders
Venezia F.C. players
Bologna F.C. 1909 players